Giridih railway station, station code GRD, is the main railway station serving the city of Giridih, the headquarters of Giridih district in the Indian state of Jharkhand. Giridih station also serves as a gateway for the Jain pilgrims visiting Parasnath.

Giridih station is a terminal station located on the western end of Madhupur–Giridih line of the Asansol railway division in the Eastern Railway zone of Indian Railways. The Madhupur–Giridih route is a single-line broad-gauge between the two main railway stations Giridih and Madhupur Junction. It has a single platform and handles a total of 14 trains daily.

History 
Giridih railway station was built as a railway siding in 1871 by the British government in India (prior to the India's independence in 1947) mainly for transport of mineral reserve from the region. The contract for the railway siding was awarded in 1865 and the construction was completed in 1871. In 1901 the railway siding was converted into a railway station.
The siding is owned by Central Coalfields.

This extended the Madhupur–Giridih railway line to Koderma, effectively making it a Madhupur–Giridih–Koderma line.

Further extension
There are plans from the Railway ministry to connect  with  via Madhuban, for the convenience of the Jain pilgrims visiting Shikharji. The foundation for the construction of new Parasnath–New Giridih rail line was laid in 2019. The 47 km-long railway line would incur a cost of Rs 972 crore on its construction and will have two crossing stations and a couple of halts. The cost of the project would be borne by the central and the state government in 50:50 ratio and a target has been set to complete the project by 2023.

There are other proposals as well to connect  with  via Tundi and Govindpur, and with  via Bengabad, Chakai and Sono. The first phase of the Jhajha–New Giridih rail line involves 20 km-long Jhajha–Batia section, the foundation for which was laid in 2019 and which will be constructed at a cost of Rs 496 crore.

Facilities 
The major facilities available are waiting rooms, toilets, computerized reservation facility, reservation counter, and two wheeler and four wheeler vehicle parking. The vehicles are allowed to enter the station premises.

Platforms
Currently there is a single platform apart from the railway siding that was built earlier.

Station layout

Trains 
Giridih terminal station handles trains five times daily except Thursdays and four times on Thursday. The passenger trains are run by Eastern Railway zone. Following are the trains arriving and departing from Giridih railway station.

Nearest airports
The nearest airports to Giridih railway station are:

Deoghar Airport, Deoghar 
Kazi Nazrul Islam Airport, Durgapur 
Birsa Munda Airport, Ranchi  
Gaya Airport 
Lok Nayak Jayaprakash Airport, Patna 
Netaji Subhas Chandra Bose International Airport, Kolkata

See also 

 Madhupur–Giridih–Koderma line

References

External links 
 
 Official website of the Giridih district

Asansol railway division
Railway stations in Giridih district
Railway stations opened in 1871